The Mozart Medal (Spanish: Medalla Mozart) is a music award in Mexico. It is administered by the Austrian embassy and the Academia Medalla Mozart. In the past the Domecq Cultural Institute (Instituto Cultural Domecq) was involved.

It was established in 1991, the 200th anniversary of Wolfgang Amadeus Mozart's death.

Notable recipients
Among the award's recipients are:
 Plácido Domingo, 1991
 Enrique Bátiz, 1991
 Manuel de Elías, 1991
 Mario Lavista, 1991
 Francisco Araiza, 1991
 Vienna Boys' Choir, 1993
 Ricardo Zohn-Muldoon, 1994
 Carlos Prieto, 1995
 Javier Torres Maldonado, 1999
 Felix Carrasco, 2002
 Sergio Vela, 2006

See also
 Mozart Medal (disambiguation)

External links
 , with full list of recipients

Latin American music awards
Wolfgang Amadeus Mozart